James Manager is a Nigerian senator of the People's Democratic Party representing Delta South Senatorial District of Delta State in the Nigerian Senate. He became a Senator in 2003.

Background

Manager attended Epiekiri Primary School Ogbeinama in 1974. He had his secondary school education at FSLC
School of Basic
Studies, Port
Harcourt in 1983.
Manager has an LLB Hons in Law from Ahmadu Bello University in 1986, then he graduated from the Nigerian Law School in 1987 and he got LLM  in Law from the University of Lagos in 1989.

Political career
Manager was elected to the Senate on the People's Democratic Party ticket for the Delta South Senatorial District in 2003. He was appointed to the Works committee, Niger Delta committee and Judiciary, Human Rights and Legal Matters committee.

In May 2009, he raised the issue of the damage caused by the continued military bombardment of communities in the oil-rich Gbaramatu clan, Warri South Local Government Area of Delta State, leading to a senate resolution urging the Committee on Defence and Army to take action.
He was joined in his protest against the violence by former Senator Fred Brume, who called it "an unequal battle that is drastically de-populating several parts of the region.
In September 2009, Senator Manager urged President Umaru Yar'Adua to appoint someone familiar with the region as Minister of the newly created Ministry of Niger Delta.

Manager supported finding a diplomatic solution to the Joint Task Force attacks on Ijaw villages, saying war was not the right approach.

Manager successfully ran for re-election as Delta South Senator on the PDP platform in the April 2011 elections.

References

Muhammed Alhaji Goni 
Algoni Adam Gudusu 

Elected senator of 8th national assembly for a record 4th time, no other senator from the south  has ever achieved.

(( Muhammed Alhaji Goni

People from Delta State
Living people
Peoples Democratic Party members of the Senate (Nigeria)
Nigerian Law School alumni
Ahmadu Bello University alumni
University of Lagos alumni
21st-century Nigerian politicians
Peoples Democratic Party (Nigeria) politicians
Year of birth missing (living people)